Triunfo is a municipality in the Northeastern Brazilian state of Pernambuco. The estimated population in 2020, according to the Brazilian Institute of Geography and Statistics (IBGE) was 15,243. The area of the municipality is 191.52 km2, and in 2010 the population density was 78 inhabitants/km2.

Far inland and with a milder climate than the surrounding semi-arid plateau, the city has the nickname "Oasis of the Sertão", and tourism is a significant part of the economy. Its current mayor is Luciano Fernando de Sousa (better known as Luciano Bonfim) of the Avante party, elected in 2020.

Geography
 Region – Sertão of Pernambuco
 Boundaries – state of Paraíba (N);  Calumbi (S);  Flores (E); Santa Cruz da Baixa Verde   (W)
 Area – 191.52 km2
 Elevation – 1004 m
 Drainage basin – Pajeú River
 Vegetation – Semi-deciduous forest
 Climate – Tropical wet and dry (Köppen Aw)
 Annual average temperature – 20.4 °C
 Distance to Recife – 403 km

Climate

Economy
The main economic activities in Triunfo are tourism, commerce and agribusiness, especially farming of goats, cattle, sheep, ;  and plantations of guavas and sugarcane.

Economic indicators

Economy by sector
2006

Health indicators

References

External links 

 Official website of the Prefeitura (mayor and city hall) of Triunfo (in Portuguese)
 Official website of the Câmara Municipal (city council) of Triunfo (in Portuguese)

Municipalities in Pernambuco